Prayers for the Stolen is a 2021 Mexican drama film directed and written by Tatiana Huezo, which adapts Jennifer Clement's novel Prayers for the Stolen.

Plot
Three girls in San Miguel, Jalisco come of age in a rural village that is dominated by the drug trade and human trafficking.The movie opens with the mother digging a hole for the little girl. We then see a boy working in a quarry. He doesn't look very happy. The people of the village are looking for a phone call in the hills of the village to ask their relatives for money. Ana calls her father but gets no answer. On her way home, Ana sees a woman crying in despair. The woman tells her to go home. Ana sees a scorpion on the ceiling and falls asleep. The next day starts with a school scene in which one of the students says "the scorpion has a stinger to protect it from its enemies". The next scene returns to the people working in the quarry and there is a huge explosion. 

When her mother sees Ana wearing lipstick, she gets very angry and threatens her. Her mother takes Ana to the hairdresser. Here she cuts her hair like a man. Ana then goes to the house of her friend Juana, who is rumored to have been kidnapped, and looks out the window. The parents listen to the teacher. She reports that the cartels are demanding immediate payment.

The movie makes a time jump and goes to about 5-6 years later. Ana is moved by what the teacher tells her and dreams of changing the existing order. Then the cartels come to get Ana. But Ana immediately hides. The movie closes with a travel scene.

Cast

Release 
In June 2021, the film was selected to compete in the Un Certain Regard section at the 2021 Cannes Film Festival. At Cannes, it won a Special Mention in the Un Certain Regard section.

The film was theatrically released in Mexico on 16 September 2021. In October 2021, it was disclosed to be the Mexican entry for the Best International Feature Film at the 94th Academy Awards. It began streaming on Netflix on 17 November 2021.

Awards and nominations

See also
 List of submissions to the 94th Academy Awards for Best International Feature Film
 List of Mexican submissions for the Academy Award for Best International Feature Film

References

External links
 

2021 films
2021 drama films
2020s Spanish-language films
Mexican drama films
Films set in Mexico
Films about Mexican drug cartels
Works about Mexican drug cartels
2020s Mexican films